Nichole Lee Serlenga (born June 20, 1978) is an American retired soccer player. She is a former United States women's national soccer team player and received a silver medal as a member of the 2000 U.S. Olympic Team.

Early life
Born in San Diego, California, Serlenga scored 103 career goals for San Pasqual High School (Escondido, California).

Collegiate career
Serlenga attended Santa Clara University and finished her college career with 15 goals and 28 assists in 84 matches.  She was a two-time First-Team NSCAA All-American and helped the Santa Clara Broncos to four consecutive Final Fours.

Club career
Serlenga played for the Atlanta Beat in the Women's United Soccer Association (WUSA) in 2001.

International career
Serlenga was a member of the U-20 National Team pool in 1999. She was called up to the United States women's national soccer team and earned her first cap and goal on January 7, 2000, against Czech Republic.

She represented the United States at the 2000 Summer Olympics in Sydney, Australia and was a member of the silver medal-winning team.

International goals

See also
 United States women's national soccer team
 Atlanta Beat

References

External links 
 Nikki Serlenga player profile

1978 births
Living people
American women's soccer players
United States women's international soccer players
Footballers at the 2000 Summer Olympics
Olympic silver medalists for the United States in soccer
Santa Clara Broncos women's soccer players
Atlanta Beat (WUSA) players
Women's association football midfielders
Medalists at the 2000 Summer Olympics
Women's United Soccer Association players